Bombur  may refer to:
 Bombur (crustacean), a genus of fossil prawns in the family Penaeidae
 Bombur (Middle-earth), a character in JRR Tolkien's novel The Hobbit
 Bombur, a dwarf in Norse mythology, named in Voluspo in the Elder Edda